L'ultimo travestimento is a 1916 Italian film directed by Augusto Genina.

External links

1916 films
Italian silent feature films
Films directed by Augusto Genina
Italian black-and-white films